Broc Nicol (born April 22, 1998) is a speedway rider from the United States.

Career
Nicol won the United States Championship twice in 2017 and 2020. 

Nicol began his British racing career riding for Sheffield Tigers in 2018. The following season he remained with Sheffield but also rode in the top tier of British Speedway for King's Lynn Stars. In 2021, he rode for the Wolverhampton Wolves in the SGB Premiership 2021, in addition to the Glasgow Tigers in the SGB Championship 2021. The following season in 2022, he rode for Glasgow again in the SGB Championship 2022.

References 

1998 births
Living people
American speedway riders
Glasgow Tigers riders
King's Lynn Stars riders
Sheffield Tigers riders
Wolverhampton Wolves riders